Seb Jewell (born 20 December 1987 in London, England) is a rugby union player for London Welsh in the Aviva Championship. He previously played for Harlequins and London Wasps.

References

External links
Harlequins profile
 sebjewllblog.wordpress.com

1987 births
Living people
Rugby union centres
English rugby union players
Esher RFC players
Rugby union players from Windsor, Berkshire